Costa y Guillamón is a barrio of La Paz in the Canelones Department of southern Uruguay.

Geography

Location
It is located at the west side of the city, on the south edge of the lake Canteras de La Paz.

Population
In 2011 Costa y Guillamón had a population of 530.
 
Source: Instituto Nacional de Estadística de Uruguay

References

External links
INE map of La Paz, Barrio Cópola, Costa y Guillamón, Villa Paz S.A. and Barrio La Lucha

Populated places in the Canelones Department